Vřesina may refer to places in the Czech Republic:

Vřesina (Opava District), a municipality and village in the Moravian-Silesian Region
Vřesina (Ostrava-City District), a municipality and village in the Moravian-Silesian Region